Michael Wiesinger (born 27 December 1972) is a German football manager and former player who last coached 1. FC Nürnberg.

Playing career 
A midfielder, Wiesinger began his professional career with 1. FC Nürnberg, before joining Bayern Munich on a free transfer in 1999. He spent two years at Bayern, winning two German titles and the Champions League, but made few first team appearances before moving to Bayern's rivals TSV 1860 München, where he had previously been a youth team player. He spent two and a half years at 1860, moving on to Wacker Burghausen, his hometown club, in January 2004. He left the club in June 2007 and joined SpVgg Weiden, where he spent one year before retiring.

Managerial career

FC Ingolstadt 
He took up his role as coach of FC Ingolstadt's reserve team. Since 9 November 2009, he was caretaker manager of the first team before being later confirmed as manager. Almost exactly a year later, Wiesinger was sacked with Ingolstadt in 17th place in the 2. Bundesliga.

1. FC Nürnberg 
In April 2011, he returned to 1. FC Nürnberg, to take charge of the club's reserve team. He was promoted to manager of the first team in December 2012, after Dieter Hecking left to take over at VfL Wolfsburg. Wiesinger was sacked by the club on 7 October 2013, the day after a 5–0 home defeat by Hamburger SV in the 2013-14 Bundesliga. On the day of Wiesinger's sacking, the club had scored a total of only five points and remained without a win after the first eight matches of the 2013–2014 Bundesliga, and was in the third last position in the league table. "The recent games showed that no consistent upward trend is developing. It was a very difficult decision, but in the interest of 1. FC Nürnberg we feel forced to act", Nürnberg's sporting director Martin Bader said.

KFC Uerdingen 05 
In July 2017 Wiseinger became the new manager of KFC Uerdingen 05. He left the club by mutual consent on 15 March 2018 despite the club being at first place in Regionalliga West.

Second stint at 1. FC Nürnberg 
He returned to Nürnberg on 29 June 2020 for the relegation-playoffs.

Managerial statistics

Honours

Player 
Bayern Munich
 Bundesliga: 2000–01
 DFB-Pokal: 1999–2000
 DFB-Ligapokal: 1999, 2000
 UEFA Champions League: 2000–01

References

External links 

1972 births
Living people
People from Burghausen, Altötting
Sportspeople from Upper Bavaria
German footballers
German football managers
Association football midfielders
1. FC Nürnberg players
FC Bayern Munich footballers
TSV 1860 Munich players
SV Wacker Burghausen players
Bundesliga players
2. Bundesliga players
1. FC Nürnberg managers
FC Ingolstadt 04 managers
Bundesliga managers
2. Bundesliga managers
3. Liga managers
UEFA Champions League winning players
SV Elversberg managers
Footballers from Bavaria
KFC Uerdingen 05 managers
West German footballers